Lepidonotus squamatus is a species of polychaete worm, commonly known as a "scale worm", in the family Polynoidae. This species occurs in both the Atlantic and the Pacific Oceans. It was first described by the Swedish naturalist Carl Linnaeus in 1758 as Aphrodita squamata but was later transferred to the genus Lepidonotus.

Description
The prostomium has two lobes and bears several pairs of antennae, a pair of palps and two pairs of eyes. The dorsal surface of the body, which has uniform width, is completely concealed by two rows of overlapping scales, resembling fish scales. These scales are modified cirri and are supported on short stalks. They are covered in tubercles of varying sizes, and have a fringe of papillae.

Distribution and habitat
Lepidonotus squamatus occurs in Western Europe, including the North Sea, the Skagerrak, the Kattegat, the Öresund Strait and the western Baltic Sea. It is also present on the eastern seaboard of North America from Labrador southward to New Jersey and on the western seaboard from Alaska to California. Its habitat is typically beneath stones or among tangled growth.

Ecology
Scale worms play a role on the seabed similar to that of isopods (pill bugs or woodlice) on land. They are carnivorous, feeding on crabs, starfish, gastropod molluscs and any other small invertebrate they come across.

The scales of Lepidonotus squamatus emit a faint bioluminescent glow. This is a defensive mechanism, because any predator feeding on the worm is likely to acquire some scales which will adhere to its mouthparts; these will make it more visible, alerting its own predators to its whereabouts.

References

Phyllodocida
Animals described in 1758
Fauna of the Pacific Ocean
Fauna of the Atlantic Ocean
Taxa named by Carl Linnaeus